David Perry (30 June 1929 – 23 August 2007) was a New Zealand cricketer. He played twenty-one first-class matches for Auckland between 1949 and 1959.

See also
 List of Auckland representative cricketers

References

External links
 

1929 births
2007 deaths
New Zealand cricketers
Auckland cricketers
Cricketers from Auckland